Gombe State is a state in northeastern Nigeria, bordered to the north and northeast by the states of Borno and Yobe, to the south by Taraba State, to the southeast by Adamawa State, and to the west by Bauchi State. Named for the city of Gombe, the state's capital and largest city, Gombe State was formed from a part of Bauchi State on October 1, 1996. The state is among the multilingual states in Nigeria. Of the 36 states in Nigeria, Gombe is the 21st largest in area and the 32nd most populous, with an estimated population of about 3.25 million as of 2016.

Geographically, the state is within the tropical West Sudanian savanna ecoregion. Important geographic features include the Gongola River, which flows through Gombe's north and east into Lake Dadin Kowa, and part of the Muri Mountains, a small range in the state's far south. Among the state's nature are a number of snake species including carpet viper, puff adder, and Egyptian cobra populations along with hippopotamus, Senegal parrot, and grey-headed kingfisher populations.

Ethnically, the State is inhabited by various ethnic groups, primarily the Fulani people living in the north and center of the state along with the Bolewa, Kanuri, and Hausa people, while the state's diverse eastern and southern regions are populated by the Cham, Dadiya, Jara, Kamo, Pero, Tangale, Tera, and Waja people.

In the pre-colonial period, the area that is now Gombe State was split up between various states until the early 1800s, the Fulani jihad seized much of the area and formed the Gombe Emirate under the Sokoto Caliphate. In the 1910s, British expeditions occupied the Emirate and the surrounding areas, incorporating them into the Northern Nigeria Protectorate which later merged into British Nigeria before becoming independent as Nigeria in 1960. Originally, modern-day Gombe State was a part of the post-independence Northern Region until 1967 when the region was split and the area became part of the North-Eastern State. After the North-Eastern State was split, Bauchi State was formed in 1976 alongside ten other states. Twenty years afterward, a group of LGAs in the Bauchi's west was broken off to form the new Gombe State.

Economically, Gombe State is largely based around agriculture, mainly of sorghum, maize, groundnuts, millet, beans, rice and tomatoes. Other key industries are services, especially in the city of Gombe, and the livestock herding of camels, cattle, goats, and sheep. Gombe has the fourth lowest Human Development Index and second lowest GDP in the country.

Gombe State's slogan is the Jewel In The Savannah. It was formed in October 1996 from part of the old Bauchi State by the Abacha military government.

Overview
The state has an area of 20,265 km2 and a population of around 2,365,000 people as of 2006.

It was formed in October 1996, from part of the old Bauchi State by the Abacha military government. The state is located in Nigeria's Guinea savannah and Sudan savannah belts. Undulating hills, sandy rocks, and a few volcanic rocks make up the landscape. Its location in the north eastern zone, right within the expansive savannah, allows the state to share common borders with the states of Borno, Yobe, Taraba, Adamawa and Bauchi.

Gombe has two distinct climates, the dry season (November–March) and the rainy season (April–October) with an average rainfall of 850mm.

The State is headed by the Executive Governor Muhammad Inuwa Yahaya and also has 24 State House Assembly members. Gombe has 11 Local Government Areas and 14 Emirates/chiefdoms. It has 3 Senators and 6 Members in the National Assembly (Nigeria).

Local Government Areas 

Gombe State consists of eleven (11) Local Government Areas. They are:

Demographics 
Gombe State is a multi-ethnic society that consists of the majority Fulani tribe, who inhabit the Northern part of the Gombe State. They dominate 6 out of the 11 Local Government Areas of the state. This include Dukku, Kwami, Funakaye, Nafada, Akko, and Gombe LGAs. Apart from the Fulani, there are also the Tangale, found in Billiri and Kaltungo areas. Other ethnicities include the Hausa, Tula, Tera (Yamaltu-Deba), Waja, Bolewa, and Kanuri, with their different cultural as well as lingual affiliations.

Politics 
The state government is led by a democratically elected governor who works closely with members of the state's house of assembly. The Capital city of the State is Gombe.

Electoral system 
The electoral  system of each state is selected using a modified two-round system. To be elected in the first round, a candidate must receive the plurality of the vote and over 25% of the vote in at least two -third of the State local government Areas. If no candidate passes threshold, a second round will be held between the top candidate and the next candidate to have received a plurality of votes in the highest number of local government Areas.

Climate 
At 451.61 meters (1481.66 ft) above sea level, Gombe has a tropical wet and dry climate or savanna climate. The city averages a yearly temperature of 30.54 °C (86.97 °F), which is 1.08% warmer than the country as a whole. Gombe has 96.26 wet days (26.37% of the time) and receives approximately 66.84 millimeters (2.63 inches) of rain annually.

Languages
Languages of Gombe State listed by LGA:

Education 
Higher institutions in Gombe State are:

 Federal University Kashere
 Gombe State University 
 Federal College of Education (Technical), Gombe
 Federal College of Horticultural Technology, Dadin Kowa
 Federal Polytechnic, Kaltungo
 College of Education, Billiri
 Gombe State College of Legal Studies, Nafada
 Gombe State Polytechnic, Bajoga
 Gombe State University of science and Technology, Kumo
 Gombe State College of Health Sciences and Technology, Kaltungo
 Performance College of Health, Science and Technology, Billiri
 Garkuwa College of Health, Science and Technology Gombe
 Dukku International College of Health, Science and Technology
 Haruna Rasheed College of Health, Science and Technology, Dukku 
 Ummah College of Health, Science and Technology, Gombe
 Lamido School of Hygiene, Liji

Healthcare 
Gombe has a lot of hospitals and medical health cares, some which are owned by the state government, some by federal government, and some by private individuals. The health cares provide healthcare service to people within and outside Gombe.

Federal Government Hospitals 

 Federal Teaching Hospital Gombe (FTHG)

State Government Hospitals 

 Gombe State Specialist Hospital
 Zainab Bulkachuwa Women and Children Hospital
 Pantami Primary Healthcare
 Arawa Primary Healthcare
 Gabukka Primary Healthcare
 Kundulum Primary Healthcare
 Town Marternity (Gidan Magani)
 Nasarawo Primary Healthcare
 Doma Primary Healthcare
 Billiri General Hospital

Private Hospitals 

 Musaba Hospital
 Miyetti Hospital
 Sunnah Hospital
 Foresight Hospital
 Metro Hospital
 AHAJAS Memorial Hospital
 Sabana Specialist Hospital

Drug Stores 

 A. A. Aliyu Mega Store
 Jambandu Phamarcy
 Kumbi Chemist
 Sauki Pharmacy

Governors 
This is a list of administrators and Governors of Gombe State.

Agencies in Gombe

Waterboard

Gombe State Water Board is a Gombe State Government organisation that aims at providing water for the citizens of Gombe State for domestic, industrial and commercial purposes.

The government's organisations is governed by a board of directors composed of a part-time chairman, the chief executive or chief manager and nine other members.

All members of the organisation are being appointed by the Governor and are serving on part-time bases, except the General Manager.

Board Members

The Secretary/Legal Adviser 
The Secretary/Legal Adviser is a legal practitioner appointed by the Governor to render Legal Services to the Board.

The General Manager 
The General Manager is responsible for the day-to-day management of the Board and assisted in the performance of his duties by five (5) Assistants.

The responsibilities of the General Manager cover Projects Management and Planning, Operation and Services, Finance and Supply and Commercial Departments.

Currently, the governor of Gombe state, Alhaji Muhammadu Inuwa Yahaya, has appointed Magaji Abubakar Difa as the general manager of the organisation.

GOGIS
Gombe State Geographic Information System (GOGIS) is a digitalised land administrative system that carried out the process of determining, recording, disseminating information about land acquisition, ownership, its value and land management policies in Gombe State.

Notable people 

Amina Mohammed, UN deputy secretary
Usman Faruk, the first military governor of the defunct northwestern state 
Sheikh Dahiru Bauchi, teacher, preacher
Sheikh Kabir Muhammad Haruna Gombe, preacher
Isa Ali Pantami, preacher and Minister of communication 
Danladi Mohammed, politician
Joshua M. Lidani, politician
Eli Jidere Bala, engineer
Usman Bayero Nafada, politician
Samkon Gado, Nigerian-American otolaryngologist and American football player
Zainab Adamu Bulkachuwa, jurist
Jaaruma, entrepreneur
Aliyu Modibbo Umar, politician
Mohammed Danjuma Goje, politician
Helon Habila, novelist
 Dahiru Mohammed, Politician
 Abubakar Buba Atare, Emir of Tula Chiefdom
 Buba Yero, the first Emir of Gombe
 Abubakar Shehu-Abubakar, 11th Emir of Gombe
 Musa Dankyau, Professor of Family Medicine 
 Abdullahi Mahdi Educationalist 
 Abdulkadir Abubakar Senior Head District of Gombe 
 Tahir Inuwa Ibrahim Preacher and Academician 
 Muhammad Jibrin Politician 
 Musa Adam Maihula Preacher 
 Usman Isah Taliyawah Preacher 
 Adamu Muhammad Dokoro Preacher 
 Abubakar Mua'azu Hassan Politician 
 Aliyu Usman El-Nafaty OFR, Academician

Natural Resources in Gombe 

Gombe State is blessed with abundant natural resources which are attractive to investors. Among such resources are: 
Uranium
Coal
Limestone
Gypsum

Tourist Attractions in Gombe 
The state has a lot of attraction and they include:

The Tomb of Sultan Attahiru

Bubayero's Tomb

The famous Bima Hill

The Dadin Kowa Dam

The Killang Hill

The Tula Plateau

The Bulok Warm Spring

The Kalam Hill

The Cham Valley

The Ancient Binga Ruins

Major Mash Grave

LT Phillips Grave

Bace Hills

Tula Hideout Caves

Kanawa Forest

Companies/Industries 

 Ashaka Cement
 Gombe Rice

Radio and TV Stations in Gombe 

National Television Authority (NTA), Gombe
Gombe Media Corporation (GMC), Radio Station
GM TV
Progress Radio and TV 
Jewel FM
Amana FM
Vision FM
Ray power

See also 

 Gombe International  Conference Center
 Religion in Gombe

References

External links 

 Daily post
 The Punch
 The nation

 
States of Nigeria
States and territories established in 1996